George F. Gibson (born 11 November 1945) is a Scottish former professional footballer who played as a central defender and midfielder.

Career
Gibson played in Scotland and Australia for West Calder United, Falkirk and Sydney Olympic.

References

External links
George Gibson at Aussie Footballers

1945 births
Living people
Scottish footballers
West Calder United F.C. players
Falkirk F.C. players
Sydney Olympic FC players
Scottish Football League players
Association football defenders
Association football midfielders
Scottish expatriate footballers
Scottish expatriate sportspeople in Australia
National Soccer League (Australia) players
Expatriate soccer players in Australia